This is a list of the squads of the six franchise teams which competed in the 2021 Kashmir Premier League, a 20-over cricket league. The draft was planned to take place on 3 April 2021 but was later moved to 3 July due to the tournament being rescheduled from June to August. The draft took place in Islamabad. Each franchise was required to select a total of 5 emerging players. The tournament was held entirely in Muzaffarabad.

Key

Bagh Stallions

Kotli Lions

Mirpur Royals

Muzaffarabad Tigers

Overseas Warriors

Rawalakot Hawks

References

Kashmir Premier League (Pakistan)